Radiation (BBC Recordings 84–86) is a collection of recordings from Cabaret Voltaire during their most accessible period. They were also made in the BBC's studios with in-house producers and engineers rather than the usual self-produced material at Western Works studios.

Track listing

 "Sensoria" - 4:27
 "Digital Rasta" - 4:43
 "Kind" - 4:38
 "Ruthless" - 3:57
 "Sleep Walking" - 5:55
 "Big Funk" - 5:56
 "The Operative" - 3:35
 "You Like To Torment Me" - 5:33
 "Hey! Hey!" - 3:47
 "We've Got Heart" - 4:44
 "Sex, Money, Freaks" - 4:16
 "I Want You" - 4:31
 "Doom Zoom" - 5:01

Personnel
Cabaret Voltaire
 Stephen Mallinder - bass, vocals
 Richard H. Kirk - sequencers, synthesizers, programming, electric guitar, saxophone, electric violin 
 Mark Tattersall - drums, percussion 
with:
Alan Fisch - drums, percussion on "I Want You"

Notes
 Tracks 1 through 4 come from the October 18, 1984 Session with Janice Long
 Tracks 5 through 7 come from the October 22, 1984 Session with John Peel
 Tracks 8 through 11 come from the August 6, 1986 Session with Janice Long
 Tracks 12 and 13 are non BBC Material

References

 

Cabaret Voltaire (band) albums
BBC Radio recordings
1999 live albums
1999 compilation albums